Chicago Bulls College Prep (CBCP) is a public four-year charter high school located on the Near West Side of Chicago, Illinois. It is a part of the Noble Network of Charter Schools. It is named after the Chicago Bulls basketball team, which endowed the school.

Chicago Bulls College Prep is a level 1+ school, based on CPS rankings.

The building was formerly known as McKinley High School - one notable attendee in 1917 was Walt Disney.

The school opened in August 2009.

Academics

The school has an average graduation rate of 82%.

In 2017, it was reported that all students in the senior class that year and since 2013 had been accepted to colleges and 50% of them dropped out.

Athletics

The school is a member of the Illinois High School Association (IHSA).

Discipline and controversy

As with other Noble Charter schools in Chicago, in 2012-13 Chicago Bulls College Prep expelled and suspended a larger proportion of students than public schools in Chicago. The school expelled 1.75% of its students in the year, compared to 0.05% of students in Chicago public schools, and suspended 38.5% of students compared to 9% of students in public schools.

The school has been criticised for charging parents for their children's disciplinary offences.

In 2016, a parent reported that the school had discouraged her son from applying to an historically black college.

References

External links

Noble Network of Charter Schools
Public high schools in Chicago
2009 establishments in Illinois
Educational institutions established in 2009